Produzioni Europee Associati (P.E.A) is a production company founded in 1962 by Alberto Grimaldi to produce international co-productions. It released its first feature film The Shadow of Zorro (L'ombra di Zorro) in December that year. Its next production was its first Spaghetti Western Texas Ranger (I due violenti, 1964).

After the A Fistful of Dollars (1964), United Artists financed the rest of the Dollars Trilogy films, For a Few Dollars More (1965) and The Good, the Bad and the Ugly (1966), all directed by Sergio Leone, and it signed a contract to distribute PEA films.

In 1976, due to the success of the cinema of the United States, PEA lost vitality and viewers so then it began only to work in Europe.

References

Film production companies of Italy
United Artists